The Big More is an extended play by Welsh alternative rock band the Joy Formidable. It was released on 14 October 2011 as a digital download and CD; the latter was distributed exclusively through the band's website. The EP is composed of remixes, live performances and an original song, "Anemone".

Track listing

Chart performance

References 

2011 EPs
Atlantic Records albums
The Joy Formidable albums